Renato e Seus Blue Caps (also known as Bacaninhas do Rock da Piedade) is a Brazilian rock band formed in Rio de Janeiro in the late 1950s. They are considered one of the most important groups of the Jovem Guarda movement, and they have written many Portuguese language versions of The Beatles' songs.

The first name was censored on the radio and Jair de Taumaturgo suggested the final name, inspired by Gene Vincent and His Blue Caps.

Renato Barros died in July 2020.

Discography 
 (2008) Jovem Guarda: Baton Vermelho (WEA)
 (2005) Renato & Seus Blue Caps (Movieplay Music)
 (2002) Série as Melhores (Sony Music Distribution)
 (1994) Baton Vermelho (Warner Music Group)
 (1987) Batom vermelho • Continental • LP
 (1983) Pra sempre • RCA Victor • LP
 (1982) Memórias/Colcha de retalhos • RCA • LP
 (1981) Renato e Seus Blue Caps • CBS • LP
 (1979) Minha vida/Nega, neguinha • CBS • LP
 (1979) Suco de laranja • CBS • LP
 (1977) Renato e Seus Blue Caps • CBS • LP
 (1976) 10 anos de Renato e Seus Blue Caps • CBS • LP
 (1974) Renato e Seus Blue Caps • CBS • LP
 (1973) Renato e Seus Blue Caps • CBS • LP
 (1972) Renato e Seus Blue Caps • CBS • LP
 (1971) Renato e Seus Blue Caps • CBS • LP
 (1970) Renato e Seus Blue Caps • CBS • LP
 (1969) Renato e Seus Blue Caps • CBS • LP
 (1968) Renato e Seus Blue Caps, vol. II • CBS • Compacto Duplo
 (1968) Especial • CBS • LP
 (1968) Especial • CBS • Compacto Duplo
 (1967) Um embalo com Renato e Seus Blue Caps, vol. II • CBS • Compacto Duplo
 (1967) Um embalo com Renato e Seus Blue Caps, vol. III • CBS • Compacto Duplo
 (1967) Renato e Seus Blue Caps • CBS • Compacto Duplo
 (1967) Renato e Seus Blue Caps • CBS • LP
 (1966) Isto é Renato e Seus Blue Caps • CBS • Compacto Duplo
 (1966) Um embalo com Renato e Seus Blue Caps • CBS • LP
 (1966) Isto é Renato e Seus Blue Caps, Vol. II • CBS • Compacto Duplo
 (1965) Viva a juventude • CBS • LP
 (1965) Menina linda/Canto pra fingir • CBS • Compacto simples
 (1965) Viva a juventude • CBS • Compacto Duplo
 (1965) Viva a juventude, vol. II • CBS • Compacto Duplo
 (1965) O escândalo/Preciso ser feliz • CBS • Compacto simples
 (1965) Isto é Renato e Seus Blue Caps • CBS • LP
 (1964) Vera Lúcia/Noturno/Bigorrilho/We like birdland • CBS • Compacto Duplo
 (1963) Boogie do bebê/Limbo rock • Copacabana • 78
 (1963) Renato e Seus Blue Caps • Som • LP
 (1962) Multiplicação/Limbo do Trá-lá-lá • Som • 78
 (1962) Twist com Renato e Seus Blue Caps • Som • LP

References

External links
 

Brazilian rock music groups
Rock music duos
Jovem Guarda
Musical groups established in the 1950s
Musical groups disestablished in 2020
Musical groups from Rio de Janeiro (city)
1950s establishments in Brazil
2020 disestablishments in Brazil